Colin Cook (born 29 August 1954) is an English former motorcycle speedway rider who rode for Ipswich Witches and Leicester Lions in the British League, before spending eight successive seasons with the Exeter Falcons.

Biography
Cook was born in Southwold in 1954. He took up speedway while working as a plant fitter, initially at Mildenhall, before joining Ipswich Witches in the mid-1970s. He was loaned out to National League team Scunthorpe Saints in 1975, averaging 5.91 in his first season. After a further season at Scunthorpe he moved on to the Boston Barracudas in 1977. A much improved season saw his average rise and he also won the National League Best Pairs Championship with Rob Hollingworth. In 1978 he was recalled by Ipswich and was part of the cup-winning team that year. Cook transferred to Leicester Lions early in the 1979 season for 2,500. In 1982 he rose to the position of third heat-leader for the Lions, but his time at Leicester was hampered by injuries. After the Lions closed down in 1983, Cook moved back to Boston in 1984, before spending the last eight years of his career with the Exeter Falcons, retiring at the end of the 1992 season.

References

1954 births
People from Southwold
Living people
Ipswich Witches riders
Scunthorpe Scorpions riders
Boston Barracudas riders
Leicester Lions riders
Exeter Falcons riders